Memory is a 2022 American action thriller film directed by Martin Campbell from a screenplay by Dario Scardapane. It is based on the novel De Zaak Alzheimer by Jef Geeraerts and is a remake of the novel's previous adaptation, the Belgian film The Alzheimer Case. The film stars Liam Neeson as a brooding hitman with early dementia who must go on the run after declining a contract on a young girl; Guy Pearce, Monica Bellucci, Harold Torres, Taj Atwal and Ray Fearon also star.

Memory was theatrically released in the United States on April 29, 2022 by Open Road Films, and received mostly negative reviews from critics.

Plot
Alex Lewis is a contract killer living in Mexico who suffers from early onset Alzheimer's and works for Davana Sealman. He is assigned to kill a man in El Paso, Texas, where he grew up and where his brother lives in residence at a nursing home due to severe Alzheimer's disease. The target of the hit is Ellis Van Camp, a builder for the Texas Central Processing Facility. Meanwhile, Vincent Serra of the FBI's Child Exploitation Task Force is undercover in El Paso trying to arrest "Papa Leon," a sex trafficker. Vincent kills Papa Leon after the latter takes his daughter Beatriz hostage during the sting operation. Beatriz is taken to the Processing Facility, where she had been held previously, before ending up at a group home. Vincent is frustrated that his domestic investigations into trafficking are frequently foiled.

Alex kills Ellis and steals a flash drive from his safe. He finds out his second target is Beatriz, but after breaking into the group home, refuses to kill her as he believes children are "off limits." He threatens William Borden, Davana's lawyer, asking him to cancel the contract on Beatriz. Instead, she is killed by another hitman, Mauricio. The next morning Alex wakes in a hotel room after a one-night stand and sees news of Beatriz's murder. He realizes he is in danger and tells Maya, the woman he is with, to stay in the room before heading for the parking garage. He and Mauricio get into a shootout, during which Maya is killed as she had followed Alex to return his forgotten Alzheimer pills. Alex kills Mauricio and burns both bodies inside Mauricio's car, and later goes to kill Borden.

Alex retreats to a former bakery once owned by his late father where he reviews the stolen flash drive and finds footage of Davana's son, Randy, sexually assaulting Beatriz. Randy panics after learning of Borden's death. Davana tells her son to escape, but he first throws a party on his yacht. Vincent and his team, Mexican police detective Hugo Marquez, and Special Agent Linda Amistead, are investigating the Van Camp murder and realize that the recent crimes are connected because Van Camp and Borden were shot with bullets from the same silenced pistol. They find out that Randy is the owner of the Processing facility, Van Camp was the builder, and Borden was Randy's lawyer, realizing that Randy is likely next.

The FBI arrive at the yacht party to save Randy, but Alex kills him first. Outside, he is cornered by Vincent and Marquez but escapes despite Marquez shooting him. Alex recovers inside the bakery but his Alzheimer symptoms are worsening. Narrowly avoiding an FBI raid, Alex infiltrates Davana's penthouse which is heavily guarded by corrupt El Paso police. He shoots his way past several police officers and reaches Davana but forgets that he had removed the firing pin from his pistol and is knocked out by Davana's henchman, Danny Mora. Mora brings him in alive to interrogate him about the flash drive but another officer tells Mora that Alex needs to be taken to the hospital.

Vincent, Hugo, and Linda receive a package mailed by Alex containing the flash drive. They find Alex under police custody in the hospital where he tells them that he has evidence of Davana threatening Van Camp but cannot remember where he placed the recording. Davana blackmails her personal doctor into killing Alex, but Alex apprehends him and takes him hostage. The police arrive on scene and mistakenly shoot the hostage, but Alex makes it inside Vincent's car, telling him Davana wishes to bury this (spelling "bury" as "b-e-r-y") before stepping out and being shot dead. Vincent later realizes "b-e-r-y" were the remaining four letters of the sign on the outside the bakery where Alex hid. He finds the recording of Davana threatening Ellis, but is told by the district attorney that the tape is not enough to prosecute. Vincent is told to take some time off. Soon after, Marquez kills Davana by slitting her throat; Vincent and Linda see the news report of her death at a bar. Vincent realizes that Linda took him out to give him an alibi.

Cast
 Liam Neeson as Alex Lewis
 Guy Pearce as Vincent Serra
 Monica Bellucci as Davana Sealman
 Harold Torres as Hugo Marquez
 Taj Atwal as Linda Amistead
 Ray Fearon as Gerald Nussbaum
 Daniel de Bourg as William Borden
 Josh Taylor as Randy Sealman 
 Ray Stevenson as Detective Danny Mora
 Mia Sanchez as Beatriz Leon
 Lee Boardman as Mauricio
 Scot Williams as Ellis Van Camp
 Rebecca Calder as Wendy Van Camp
 Stella Stocker as Maya
 Natalie Anderson as Maryanne Borden
 Atanas Srebrev as Dr. Joseph Myers
 Antonio Jaramillo as Papa Leon
 Doug Rao as Andy Villalobos
 Josh Macrena as Howe
 J.R. Esposito as Ballard
 Vlado Mihailov as Coleman
 Sofia Soltess as Emma Van Camp
 Tudor Chirila as Luis Matan
 Marina Krumova as Madera Matan
 Lubomir Buchvarov as Paul
 Sigal Diament as Serena
 Danay Velinova as Marisol
 Louis Mandylor as Drunk broker
 Jake Tapper as Himself (uncredited)

Production
In February 2020, it was announced that Liam Neeson will play an expert assassin with a reputation for discreet precision in Memory, an action thriller film directed by Martin Campbell. In April 2021, principal photography commenced in Bulgaria with Guy Pearce, Monica Bellucci, Harold Torres, Taj Atwal, and Ray Fearon joining the cast. The project is a joint-venture production between Briarcliff Entertainment, Open Road Films, Black Bear Pictures, Welle Entertainment, Saville Productions, and Arthur Sarkissian Productions. Rupert Parkes, who previously worked with Campbell on The Protege, composed the film's score.

Release
Memory was released in the United States by Open Road Films and Briarcliff Entertainment on April 29, 2022.

The film was released for VOD on June 21, 2022, followed by a Blu-ray and DVD release on July 5, 2022.

Box office
Memory grossed $7.3 million in the United States and Canada, and $6.7 million in other territories, for a worldwide total of $14 million.

In the United States and Canada, the film was projected to gross between $2–5 million from 2,555 theaters in its opening weekend. The film made $1.1 million on its first day and went on to debut to $3.1 million, finishing eighth at the box office. Men made up 51% of the audience during its opening, with those above the age of 25 comprising 84% of ticket sales and those above 45 comprising 46%. The ethnic breakdown of the audience showed that 49% were Caucasian, 20% Hispanic and Latino Americans, 20% African American, and 11% Asian or other. The film earned $1.4 million in its second weekend before dropping out of the box office top ten in its third with $450,038.

Critical response 
  Audiences polled by PostTrak gave it a 66% positive score, with 49% saying they would definitely recommend it.

References

External links
 
 

2022 action thriller films
2022 crime drama films
2022 crime thriller films
2022 thriller drama films
2020s English-language films
American action thriller films
American crime drama films
American crime thriller films
American remakes of Belgian films
American thriller drama films
Black Bear Pictures films
Films about Alzheimer's disease
Films about contract killing in the United States
Films about the Federal Bureau of Investigation
Films about human trafficking
Films based on adaptations
Films based on Belgian novels
Films directed by Martin Campbell
Films scored by Photek
Films set in El Paso, Texas
Films set in Guadalajara
Films shot in Bulgaria
Open Road Films films
2020s American films